Brauninidae is a monotypic family of trematodes in the order Diplostomida. It consists of one genus, Braunina Heider, 1900, which consists of one species, Braunina cordiformis Wolf, 1903.

References

Diplostomida
Trematode families